The 1980 European Super Cup was played between Nottingham Forest and Valencia, with Valencia winning on the away goals rule. Forest won the home leg 2–1, with both goals coming from Ian Bowyer. Valencia won the return at the Mestalla 1–0 thus winning on the away goals rule, this was the only time the UEFA Super Cup was settled by this method.

Match details

First leg

Second leg

See also
Nottingham Forest F.C. in European football 
Valencia CF in European football

References

External links
 Summary from UEFA
 Summary from RSSSF

Super Cup
1980
International club association football competitions hosted by Spain
International club association football competitions hosted by England
Supercup
Super Cup 1980
Super Cup 1980
Super
Super Cup
Super Cup
1980s in Nottingham